Gabriel Lobo Lasso de la Vega (1555–1615) was a Castilian poet, playwright, and historian of the Spanish Golden Age.

De la Vega came from a minor noble family, the Counts of Puertollano, and was born and died in Madrid.  He studied under the epic poet Alonso de Ercilla from 1571 to 1572. He was a king's guardsman under Philip II and Philip III.  This gave him plenty of time to pursue literature.

References
Jackson-Laufer, Guida M. (1996) "Lasso De La Vega, Gabriel Lobo (1558[sic]-1615)" Encyclopedia of Literary Epics ABC-CLIO, Santa Barbara, CA, 

1555 births
1615 deaths
Spanish dramatists and playwrights
Spanish male dramatists and playwrights
Spanish poets
Spanish male poets